Lysica or Łysica may refer to:

Lysica, a village in Slovakia
Łysica, a mountain in Poland
A former name of a former village which now part of the Polish city of Krynica Morska